Pępowo  is a village in Gostyń County, Greater Poland Voivodeship, in west-central Poland. It is the seat of the gmina (administrative district) called Gmina Pępowo.

The village has a population of 1,780.

References

Villages in Gostyń County